Atlético Clube Lagartense, commonly known as Lagartense, is a Brazilian football club based in Lagarto, Sergipe state. They competed in the Copa do Brasil twice.

History
The club was founded on August 11, 1992. Lagartense won the Campeonato Sergipano in 1998. The club competed in the Copa do Brasil in 1999 and in 2001, they were eliminated in the First Round in both seasons, respectively by Fluminense and Santa Cruz.

Achievements

 Campeonato Sergipano:
 Winners (1): 1998

Stadium
Atlético Clube Lagartense play their home games at Estádio Paulo Barreto de Menezes, nicknamed Barretão. The stadium has a maximum capacity of 8,000 people.

References

Association football clubs established in 1992
Football clubs in Sergipe
1992 establishments in Brazil